The Pennsylvania Avenue Bridge conveys Pennsylvania Avenue across Rock Creek and the adjoining Rock Creek and Potomac Parkway, between the neighborhoods of Georgetown and Foggy Bottom in Northwest Washington, D.C. Pennsylvania Avenue terminates at M Street immediately west of the bridge.

Original bridge

The original bridge at this site was constructed of large cast iron pipes by the Army Corps of Engineers in 1858 to 1860.  Montgomery C. Meigs designed the bridge and supervised its construction as part of the original construction of the Washington Aqueduct.  It was officially named the Meigs Bridge after it was completed, although name that never caught on and it was often called other names such as the Tubular Bridge.

At the time of its construction it was the only bridge made completely of cast iron of substantial size in the United States.  It was originally intended to be solely an aqueduct bridge carrying water mains connected to the Georgetown Reservoir, but the onset of the Civil War necessitated making it a vehicular crossing as well.  The level of traffic was such that the wooden deck had to be replaced every three years.

The bridge used an innovative design in which the 48-inch water pipes themselves formed the load-bearing arches of the bridge supporting the roadway.  A water pressure engine in the west abutment supplied water to a reservoir at the current site of the Georgetown branch of the D. C. Public Library to feed the significant part of the City of Georgetown that was too high to be directly fed by the main Washington Aqueduct.  A horse-drawn streetcar line crossed the bridge from 1863 to 1872, when it was rerouted over the nearby M Street Bridge.

Current bridge

In 1913 the D.C. Board of Commissioners opted to build an expanded arch bridge around the existing bridge rather than construct a completely new steel-girder bridge, for reasons of cost.  The United States Commission of Fine Arts, the agency tasked with reviewing architectural projects in the capital, opposed the plan on aesthetic grounds, saying that the arch design would clash with the existing Q Street Bridge upstream, but their recommendations were ignored.

The expanded bridge was built of reinforced concrete with a smooth granite facing.  The abutments and water mains of the original bridge are encased inside the expanded bridge, which still transports water to this day, although they no longer support the load of the bridge.  The new bridge was significantly wider than the original; increasing from 17 feet to 73 feet.

By 2015, the bridge was considered to be structurally deficient, with a 15-month rehabilitation planned to begin that summer.

See also
List of bridges documented by the Historic American Engineering Record in Washington, D.C.

References

External links

1860 establishments in Washington, D.C.
1916 establishments in Washington, D.C.
Bridges completed in 1860
Bridges completed in 1916
Bridges over Rock Creek (Potomac River tributary)
Deck arch bridges
Georgetown (Washington, D.C.)
Historic American Engineering Record in Washington, D.C.
Road bridges in Washington, D.C.
Water in Washington, D.C.
Arch bridges in the United States
Concrete bridges in the United States